Bandini (Hindi: बन्दिनी, translation: Imprisoned) is a 1963 Hindi drama film directed and produced by Bimal Roy, the man who directed classics such as Do Bigha Zameen and Devdas. Bandini stars Nutan, giving one of the most acclaimed roles of her career, her performance in the film is regarded among the best performances ever given by an actress of Hindi cinema. along with Ashok Kumar and Dharmendra as leads, and explores the human conflicts of love and hate intertwined in the mind of Kalyani (Nutan). Nutan, who had worked with Roy in Sujata (1959), was persuaded to ace in the film. The movie tells the story of a woman prisoner serving life imprisonment for murder, Kalyani, the all suffering, selfless, sacrificing and strong, yet weak Indian woman. She must make a choice between two very different men, Devendra (Dharmendra), the loving prison doctor, and Bikash (Ashok Kumar), a man from her past.

The film is based on the Bengali novel Tamasi by Jarasandha (Charu Chandra Chakrabarti), a former jail superintendent who spent much of his career as a jailor in Northern Bengal, and wrote many fictional versions of his experiences.

Bandini was the tenth highest grosser of the year and was declared a 'Semi Hit' at Box Office India, though it received not just critical acclaim, but also swept that year's Filmfare Awards, winning six awards in all, including the top awards of Best Film and Best Director, as well as Best Actress, and is still considered a landmark movie of the 1960s, especially being the last feature film of the director Bimal Roy, a master of realism.

Overview 
A female-centric movie, one of the rare ones in Indian movies, Bandini revolves around Kalyani or Bandini, literally meaning imprisoned. It is also the only film to have depicted the sacrifice made by ordinary rural women during the Indian independence struggle.

This was Bimal Roy's final feature as a director and regarded by many as his crowning achievement. After casting her, in his previous women-centric film Sujata (1959), now the key laid in persuading Nutan out of her post-nuptial retirement to play the strictly raised, poetry-loving village girl, Kalyani. Nutan is strongly supported by Ashok Kumar and Dharmendra, just beginning to make an impact in the film industry and directed by award-winning director Bimal Roy, who ventures into the life of a convict and reveals his/her humanity and the circumstances that often force an ordinary person to commit a crime. This deep social concern is however conveyed subtly without being didactic, through the predicament of the main protagonist, Kalyani lodged in the prison through the majority of the film and her longing for freedom. The film also highlights the spirit of sacrifice in the youth during the freedom struggle when a youth would even sacrifice his future wife, at his party's command. Despite having a dramatic turn of events throughout the film, the melodrama never overpowers the narrative, the pace remains engrossing yet easy, and cinematography highlights the stillness and vacuum of prison life. Nutan remains understated through the film, and the director employs irony and symbolism throughout the film to make his statement instead.

S. D. Burman composed the songs for the film, at the height of his musical career and even chose to sing one himself; "Mere Saajan Hain Uss Paar". The movie has songs such as "Mora Gora Ang Lai Le" by Lata and the haunting and brilliant "O Jaanewale Ho Sake To Laut Ke Aana" by Mukesh. The film is brilliantly photographed in black and white by Kamal Bose, with its rich tonal quality and evocative framing, especially in the stark prison scenes, winning him the Filmfare Award for the year. It was noted for its use of black and white film, to bring "texture and form in simplicity mixed with richness", especially in the way he captured the prison environment.

Plot 
The film is set in a prison in around 1934 in pre-Independence India, where Kalyani is serving life imprisonment prison for committing a murder, and we learn the circumstances of her crime in flashback as she divulges it to the jailor. The film is set in Bengal in the 1930s, during the British Raj, where Kalyani (Nutan) is the daughter of the postmaster (Raja Paranjpe) of the village, who falls in love with a freedom fighter, Bikash (Ashok Kumar), who later leaves her in the village promising to come back but never does. Society treats them harshly. Broken by her father's misery and that of her own, Kalyani moves to the city, to the singing of the sad song "O Jaanewale Ho Sake To Laut Ke Aana". In the city, she works as a caretaker of an obnoxious and mentally unstable woman, who turns out to be the wife of Bikash. Kalyani learns that her father came to the city looking for her and died in an accident. That prompts her to poison her lover's wife, identifying her as the cause of her miseries in a moment of insane rage. Director Bimalda captures her emotions as she resolves to commit the crime, with light and darkness falling on her face due to a welder's torch and the thumping of iron in the background, and the ambient sounds as she inches towards the decision, pumping vigorously into a kerosene stove, without uttering a single word through it all. And subsequently confesses to the crime with equal passion.

Back from the flashback in the jail, Deven (Dharmendra), the jail doctor falls in love with her. Kalyani is not ready for it and starts to stay away from him. They are always shown with a partition in between after Deven proposes her. Another symbolism used in the movie is the occasional shouting of "All is well" by the prison guard when nothing in the movie is; and just as Kalyani is leaving prison for good, she receives yet another ironic message from a jail official, "Ab ghar grihasthi ki jail mein qaid rahogi!"  Now you will be imprisoned in the jail of household! In the end, she finds Bikash at a ship harbour where she finds him in an ill condition. She then decides to take care of Bikash and her love is again reborn.

The lines "Main Bandini Piya ki, Main Sangini Hoon Saajan ki" in the end score of the movie tells us that Kalyani is imprisoned by her love, thus revealing the title of the film. "Mere Saajan Hain us Paar" is sung by the musician S. D. Burman himself, this climactic song beautifully expresses Kalyani's dilemma of having to choose between Bikash and Deven. Thus the character of Kalyani gets lifted from that of a woman who is a prisoner of destiny to one who defines her own freedom.

Cast 
 Ashok Kumar as Bikash Ghosh
 Nutan Behl as Kalyani
 Dharmendra as Devendra (Prison Doctor)
 Raja Paranjpe	as Kalyani's Father
 Tarun Bose as Mahesh Chandra
 Asit Sen as Shambu
 Chandrima Bhaduri – Jail warden
 Moni Chatterjee – Inspector
 Kanu Roy as Dr. Verma, Manorama Nursing Home
 Sulochana Latkar
 Hiralal as Superintendent
 Iftekhar
 Bela Bose
 Satyendra Kapoor
 Sulochana Chatterjee as Devendra's mother
  Raj Verma

Production 
Writing
The screenplay of the film was written by Nabendu Ghosh, who had previously done the Bimal Roy films Devdas (1955) and Sujata (1959). It was based on the story Tamasi by Jarasandha, pen name of Charu Chandra Chakraborty, a former jail superintendent who wrote many stories based on his career as a jailor in Northern Bengal, including many fictional versions of his experiences, Louha-Kapat (1953), Tamasha (1958) and Nyaydanda (1961), effective creating a new genre in Bengali literature of prison stories.

The principal photography of the film took place at Mohan Studios in Mumbai, with some parts in Naini Central Jail, Yerwada Central Jail and Bhagalpur Central Jail, and the climax scene on the banks of the Ganga River at Sahibganj, in present Jharkhand.

Crew 
 Assistant director: Mukul Dutt, Gulzar, Raghunath Jhalani, Debabrata Sengupta
 Art Direction: Sudhendu Roy
 Set Decoration: Shanker Kurade
 Sound recordist: Dinshaw Billimoria
 Music assistant: Rahul Dev Burman
 Costumes: Kishan B Damania

Music 

The soundtrack includes the following tracks, composed by S. D. Burman, with lyrics by Shailendra. The film also marks the debut of Gulzar, who was working as an assistant director on the film as a film lyricist, initially having refused Bimal Roy on the offering, saying that he didn't want to become a lyricist, Gulzar relented only after the film's music director S.D. Burman convinced him so, and he wrote the song "Mora Gora Ang Lai Le", sung by Lata, in five days. The rest of lyrics are by Shailendra, who gave classics like the haunting "Mere Sajan Hain Us Paar" in the bardic voice of S.D. Burman himself, Mukesh's sad song "O Jaanewale Ho Sake", where Burman uses Bhatiyali with a variation.

Though the movie features excellent songs, they all depict the situation like nothing else could, like a prisoner singing an ode to an imprisoned bird, "O Panchhi Pyare", sung by Asha Bhosle and Asha Bhosle's touching "Ab ke Baras Bhej Bhaiya ko Babul" composed in Raga Pilu, excellently uses the folk idiom of a traditional song of a newly married girl longing for her maternal home, (maika), but being sung by a prison inmate of Kalyani, immediately conveys the irony in its placement.

Awards 
 11th National Film Awards 
Best Feature Film in Hindi
 11th Filmfare Awards
 Best Film: Bimal Roy
Best Story: Jarasandha
 Best Actress: Nutan
 Best Director: Bimal Roy
 Best Cinematographer: Kamal Bose
 Best Sound: Dinshaw Billimoria

References

External links 
 Bandini at Bimal Roy Online Museum
 
 

1960s Hindi-language films
Indian black-and-white films
Films scored by S. D. Burman
Films directed by Bimal Roy
1963 drama films
1963 films
Indian prison films
Films based on Indian novels
Social realism in film
Films set in the 1930s
Films shot in Mumbai
Best Hindi Feature Film National Film Award winners